The first season of Top Chef Brasil premiered on Wednesday, April 3, 2019 at 10:30 p.m. (BRT / AMT) on RecordTV.

Contestants
Source:

Contestant progress

Key

Main guest appearances 
Episode 2
 Chef Rodrigo Ribeiro
Episode 3
 Chef Alex Atala
Episode 4
 Chef Benny Novak
Episode 5
 Chef Bel Coelho
Episode 6
 Chef Oscar Bosch
Episode 7
 Arnaldo Lorençato
 Ricardo Garrido
Episode 8
 Chef Rafael Barros
 Chef Jefferson Rueda
Episode 11
 André Bankoff
 Juliana Knust
 Jaqueline Carvalho
 Mylena Ciribelli 
 Marcos Mion

Ratings and reception

Brazilian ratings
All numbers are in points and provided by Kantar Ibope Media.

References

External links
 Tof Chef Brasil on R7.com

2019 Brazilian television seasons
Brasil, Season 1